2-Chlorobenzaldehyde (o-Chlorobenzaldehyde) is a chlorinated derivative of benzaldehyde that is used in production of CS gas. It reacts with malononitrile to form CS.

See also
CS gas
Malononitrile

References

Benzaldehydes
Chlorobenzenes